The Mzab–Wargla languages or Northern Saharan oasis dialects are a dialect cluster of the Zenati languages, within the Northern Berber subbranch. They are spoken in scattered oases of Algeria and Morocco.

Subclassification
Kossmann (2013)

Maarten Kossmann (2013) listed six "Northern Saharan oasis" dialects:
South Oranie and Figuig
Gurara
Tuwat-Tidikelt
Mzab
Wargla
Wad Righ (Tugurt)

Ethnologue (2009)
In Ethnologue XVI (2009), the "Mzab–Wargla" languages are listed as:
Tagargrent (Wargli)
Temacine Tamazight (Tugurt)
Taznatit ("Zenati": Gurara, Tuwat and South Oran)
Tumzabt (Mozabite)
Unlike Kossmann, Ethnologue considers the Berber dialect spoken in Tidikelt as a separate branch of the Zenati group, distinct from Tuwat.

Blench
Roger Blench (2006) listed eight varieties:
Gurara
Mzab, Ghardaia (Mozabite)
Wargla
Tugurt
Seghrušen
Figuig
Senhaja
Iznacen

However, Senhaja is actually an Atlas language.

Linguistic maps

References

Berber languages